This is the list of cathedrals in Bolivia.

Roman Catholic 
Cathedrals of the Roman Catholic Church in Bolivia:

 Catedral de San Pedro Virgen de la Candelaria in Aiquile
 Cathedral of St. Francis of Assisi in Camiri
 Metropolitan Cathedral of St. Sebastian in Cochabamba
 Immaculate Conception Cathedral, Concepción
 Catedral de San Pedro y San Pablo in Coroico
 Cathedral of Our Lady of Candelaria in El Alto
 Cathedral Basilica of Our Lady of Peace in La Paz
 Cathedral of the Immaculate Conception in Ñuflo de Chavez
 Cathedral of Our Lady of Lujan in Irpavi
 Catedral Nuestra Señora de la Asuncion in Oruro
 Catedral Basílica de Nuestra Señora de La Paz in Potosí
 Cathedral of St. Ignatius in San Ignacio de Velasco
 Metropolitan Cathedral-Basilica of St. Lawrence in Santa Cruz
 Cathedral Basilica of Our Lady of Guadalupe in Sucre
 Cathedral of Our Lady of Peace in Tarija

See also
List of cathedrals

References

 List
Bolivia
Cathedrals
Cathedrals